Romario Matova  (born 10 July 1999) is a Zimbabwean football player. He plays for Gabela.

International career
He made his debut for Zimbabwe national football team on 29 March 2021 in a 2021 Africa Cup of Nations qualifier against Zambia.

References

External links
 
 

1999 births
Sportspeople from Harare
Living people
Zimbabwean footballers
Zimbabwe international footballers
Association football defenders
NK Solin players
First Football League (Croatia) players
Zimbabwean expatriate footballers
Expatriate footballers in Turkey
Expatriate footballers in Croatia